The 1884 North Carolina gubernatorial election was held on November 4, 1884. Democratic nominee Alfred Moore Scales defeated Republican nominee Tyre York with 53.80% of the vote.

Democratic convention
The Democratic convention was held on June 25, 1884.

Candidates
Alfred Moore Scales, U.S. Representative
Octavius Coke
Thomas Michael Holt, State Representative

Results

Republican convention
The Republican convention was held on May 1, 1884.

Candidates
Tyre York, U.S. Representative
Oliver H. Dockery, former U.S. Representative

Results

General election

Candidates
Major party candidates
Alfred Moore Scales, Democratic
Tyre York, Republican

Other candidates
William T. Walker, Independent

Results

References

1884
North Carolina
Gubernatorial